Visa requirements for Brazilian citizens are administrative entry restrictions by the authorities of other states placed on citizens of Brazil. As of 22 July 2022, Brazilian citizens had visa-free or visa on arrival access to 170 countries and territories, ranking the Brazilian Passport 19th in terms of travel freedom (tied with the passport of Argentina), according to the Henley Passport Index.

Visa requirements map

Visa requirements

The Mercosur member states of Argentina, Brazil, Paraguay, and Uruguay, together with most other South American countries (as shown below) do not even require a Brazilian passport; a national or state-issued Brazilian identity card is enough for entry into all Mercosur member and associate states (with the exception of Guyana and Suriname).

Nevertheless, the identity card must be in good condition, must not have expired, and the holder must be clearly recognizable in the photograph.

Brazilians within Mercosur have unlimited access to any of the full members (Argentina, Paraguay, Uruguay) and associated members (Bolivia, Chile, Peru, Colombia, Ecuador) with the right to residence and work, with no requirement other than nationality. Citizens of these nine countries (including Brazil) may apply for the grant of "temporary residence" for up to two years in another country of the bloc. Then, they may apply for "permanent residence" just before the term of their "temporary residence" expires.

Brazilians may request lawful permanent resident status in Argentina and Uruguay at any time. No prior temporary resident status needed.

Dependent, disputed, or restricted territories

Unrecognised or partially recognised countries

Dependent and autonomous territories

Other territories
. Ashmore and Cartier Islands - Special authorisation required.
 Crimea. Visa not required. Territory accessed under Russian visa policy.
. Hainan - 30 days. Visa-free for Brazilian nationals.
. Tibet Autonomous Region - Tibet Travel Permit required (10 US Dollars). = How to get Tibet Travel Permit, Successful Application Tips}}</ref>
. San Andrés and Leticia - Visitors arriving at Gustavo Rojas Pinilla International Airport and Alfredo Vásquez Cobo International Airport must buy tourist cards on arrival.
.  Galápagos - Online pre-registration is required. Transit Control Card must also be obtained at the airport prior to departure.
 outside Asmara - To travel in the rest of the country, a Travel Permit for Foreigners is required (20 Eritrean nakfa).
. Lau Province - Special permission required.
  Mount Athos - Special permit required (4 days: 25 euro for Orthodox visitors, 35 euro for non-Orthodox visitors, 18 euro for students). There is a visitors' quota: maximum 100 Orthodox and 10 non-Orthodox per day and women are not allowed.
. Protected Area Permit (PAP) required for whole states of Nagaland and Sikkim and parts of states Manipur, Arunachal Pradesh, Uttaranchal, Jammu and Kashmir, Rajasthan, Himachal Pradesh. Restricted Area Permit (RAP) required for all of Andaman and Nicobar Islands and parts of Sikkim. Some of these requirements are occasionally lifted for a year.
. Visa on arrival for 15 days is available at Erbil and Sulaymaniyah airports.
. Kish Island - Visa not required.
. Closed cities - Special permission required for the town of Baikonur and surrounding areas in Kyzylorda Oblast, and the town of Gvardeyskiy near Almaty.
 outside Pyongyang - Special permit required. People are not allowed to leave the capital city, tourists can only leave the capital with a governmental tourist guide (no independent moving).
.  Sabah and  Sarawak - Visa not required. These states have their own immigration authorities and passport is required to travel to them, however the same visa applies.
 outside Malé - Permission required. Tourists are generally prohibited from visiting non-resort islands without the express permission of the Government of Maldives.
. Special authorization required for several closed cities and regions in Russia require special authorization.
 Mecca and Medina - Special access required. Non-Muslims and those following the Ahmadiyya religious movement are strictly prohibited from entry.
. Darfur - Separate travel permit is required.
 outside Khartoum - All foreigners traveling more than 25 kilometers outside of Khartoum must obtain a travel permit.
. Gorno-Badakhshan Autonomous Province - OIVR permit required (15+5 Tajikistani Somoni) and another special permit (free of charge) is required for Lake Sarez.
. Closed cities - A special permit, issued prior to arrival by Ministry of Foreign Affairs, is required if visiting the following places: Atamurat, Cheleken, Dashoguz, Serakhs and Serhetabat.
. United States Minor Outlying Islands - Special permits required for Baker Island, Howland Island, Jarvis Island, Johnston Atoll, Kingman Reef, Midway Atoll, Palmyra Atoll and Wake Island.
. Margarita Island - Visa not required. All visitors are fingerprinted.
. Phú Quốc - Visa not required for 30 days.
 outside Sana’a or Aden - Special permission needed for travel outside Sana’a or Aden.
 UN Buffer Zone in Cyprus - Access Permit is required for travelling inside the zone, except Civil Use Areas.
 Korean Demilitarized Zone - Restricted area.
 UNDOF Zone and Ghajar - Restricted area.

Visas for Cambodia, Myanmar, Rwanda, São Tomé and Príncipe, Senegal, Sri Lanka and Turkey are obtainable online.

Non-visa restrictions

See also

 Brazilian identity card
 Brazilian nationality law
 Visa policy of Brazil
 Brazilian passport

References and Notes
References

Notes

Brazil
Foreign relations of Brazil